Tsamblak Hill (‘Halm Tsamblak’ \'h&lm 'tsam-blak\) is a rocky hill trending 900 m in north-south direction, 450 m wide and rising to 113 m in eastern Byers Peninsula on Livingston Island in the South Shetland Islands, Antarctica. It surmounts Bedek Stream on the east, Feya Tarn on the south-southwest and Eridanus Stream on the west.

The hill is named after the Bulgarian scholar and Metropolitan of Kiev, Grigoriy Tsamblak (1365–1420).

Location

Maps
 Península Byers, Isla Livingston. Mapa topográfico a escala 1:25000. Madrid: Servicio Geográfico del Ejército, 1992.
 L.L. Ivanov et al. Antarctica: Livingston Island and Greenwich Island, South Shetland Islands. Scale 1:100000 topographic map. Sofia: Antarctic Place-names Commission of Bulgaria, 2005.
 L.L. Ivanov. Antarctica: Livingston Island and Greenwich, Robert, Snow and Smith Islands. Scale 1:120000 topographic map.  Troyan: Manfred Wörner Foundation, 2009.   (Second edition 2010)
 L.L. Ivanov. Antarctica: Livingston Island and Smith Island. Scale 1:100000 topographic map. Manfred Wörner Foundation, 2017.

Gallery

References
 Tsamblak Hill. SCAR Composite Gazetteer of Antarctica.
 Bulgarian Antarctic Gazetteer. Antarctic Place-names Commission. (details in Bulgarian, basic data in English)

External links
 Tsamblak Hill. Copernix satellite image

Hills of the South Shetland Islands
Bulgaria and the Antarctic